Knox is a city in Center Township, Starke County, in the U.S. state of Indiana. The population was 3,704 at the 2010 census. The city is the county seat of Starke County.

History

Knox was founded in 1851, and is named for American Revolutionary War General Henry Knox. The Knox post office has been in operation since 1820.

Geography
Knox is located along the Yellow River.

Knox is the geographic center of the Big Ten Conference, according to a 2018 article in fivethirtyeight.com that referred to locations of various NCAA Men's Basketball Conference championships.

Demographics

2010 census
As of the 2010 census, there were 3,704 people, 1,457 households, and 975 families in the city. The racial makeup of the city was 95.3% White, 0.3%African American, 0.2% Native American, 0.3% Asian, 0.4% from other races, and 1% from two or more races. Hispanic or Latino of any race were 2.9% of the population.

There were 1,457 households, of which 34.8% had children under the age of 18 living with them, 41% were married couples living together, 14% had a female householder with no husband present, 6.9% had a male householder with no wife present, and 33.1% were non-families. 27.9% of all households were made up of individuals, and 13.6% had someone living alone who was 65 years of age or older. The average household size was 2.53 and the average family size was 3.03.

The median age in the city was 36.2 years. 26% of residents were under the age of 18; 10.1% were between the ages of 18 and 24; 24.5% were from 25 to 44; 25.8% were from 45 to 64; and 13.5% were 65 years of age or older. The gender makeup of the city was 46.3% male and 53.7% female.

2000 census
As of the 2000 United States Census there were 3,721 people, 1,466 households, and 961 families in the city. The racial makeup of the city was 97.29% White, 0.11% African American, 0.24% Native American, 0.30% Asian, 0.03% Pacific Islander, 0.99% from other races, and 1.05% from two or more races. Hispanic or Latino of any race were 2.28% of the population.

There were 1,465 households, out of which 31.2% had children under the age of 18 living with them, 46.8% were married couples living together, 14.3% had a female householder with no husband present, and 34.4% were non-families. 30.6% of all households were made up of individuals, and 14.8% had someone living alone who was 65 years of age or older. The average household size was 2.43 and the average family size was 3.01.

The city population contained 25.6% under the age of 18, 8.2% from 18 to 24, 28.1% from 25 to 44, 20.5% from 45 to 64, and 17.6% who were 65 years of age or older. The median age was 37 years. For every 100 females, there were 90.4 males. For every 100 females age 18 and over, there were 87.7 males.

The median income for a household in the city was $29,891, and the median income for a family was $35,615. Males had a median income of $30,585 versus $20,994 for females. The per capita income for the city was $16,184. About 17.9% of families and 16.5% of the population were below the poverty line, including 24.9% of those under age 18 and 12.6% of those age 65 or over.

Education
The public school system of Knox consists of Knox Community Elementary School (K-4th grade), Knox Community Middle School (5-8th grade), and Knox Community High School (9-12th grade). The schools are located at 1 Redskin Trail. Total enrolment is between 800 and 900 students.

The high school has a marching band program. The Knox Redskin Brigade is a 1996, 1998, 2000, 2001, 2002 and 2003 I.S.S.M.A. Class D State finalist; a 1988, 1991, 1992 and 2017 I.S.S.M.A.  Class C State finalist; the 2005 Bands of America Indianapolis Regional Class A Champion. Knox High is the nation's first Conn-Selmer All-American High School.

Based on the 2009–10 school year, the Knox High School Student body consists of 51% males and 49% females, and a minority enrollment of 5%.

Knox has a public library, a branch of the Starke County Public Library System.

Notable people
 Henry F. Schricker, two-time Indiana Governor
 Stuart Gorrell, wrote the lyrics for the song "Georgia on My Mind".

Media
 WKVI 1520 AM and 99.3 FM. Locally owned by Kankakee Valley Broadcasting Company, serving the area since 1969.

In popular culture
The PBS Kids television series Postcards from Buster filmed its first episode, "Meet Me At the Fair" (2004), in Knox. In it Buster Baxter, the show's main character, discovers what it is like to work on a farm.

Knox features in the 2013 film Bridegroom, the fact-based story of Knox resident Tom Bridegroom.

In June 2015, the economic reporting site "24/7 Wall St.com" listed Knox as the Indiana city with the lowest average college graduation level - 5.5% of adults have a bachelor's degree or higher, compared to the statewide rate of 23.2% and the national rate of 28.8%; and reported that the city's median household income of $30,300 was $75,000 less than the median household income of Indiana's wealthiest town, Zionsville.

References

External links

 City website
 

Cities in Indiana
Cities in Starke County, Indiana
County seats in Indiana
Northwest Indiana